"The Concert" is a 1961 Australian TV GTV-9's Melbourne studios. It was directed by Rod Kinnear. Australian TV drama was relatively rare at the time.

Plot
Anne is a nurse who is blinded in an air raid during World War Two. Her aim is to move back to France to the village where she was blinded and help blind people. Determined to be independent, she originally lives with her sister Jenny then moves in to her own apartment. While Jenny is away for two weeks, Anne falls for one of her upstairs neighbours, a writer called Jennings, not knowing he is black. Jennings decides not to tell Anne he is black and moves away. He tells his friend Standish about the affair.

Cast
Ruth Gower as Anne Rivers
Chester Harriott as Richard Jennings 
Yvonne Heaslip as Jenny Rivers
Barbara Brandon  as mother  
Cyril Gardner as father   
Moira Carleton  as Matron  
Arthur Duncan as Steve   
Donna Duncan as Ella   
George Fairfax as Standish
Lewis Taggart as landlord

Production
The play had originally been written as a radio play. The play had been filmed several times in England, including once with Moira Lister in 1954 and once with Diane Cilento.

The stars of the play were an English actor, Ruth Gower, and three black American actors, Chester Harriott, Arthur Duncan and his wife Donna. Ruth Gower had come to Australia in 1960 to appear on stage opposite Basil Rathbone in Merry Go Round. It was filmed in Melbourne in October 1960, while Gower was acting at the Princess Theatre in the play. Chester Harriott was then touring Melbourne doing a song-and-piano act with Vic Evans.

Reception
The TV reviewer for The Sydney Morning Herald said that "a number of sets and some individuality in acting could not altogether bind this drama together as firmly as one would wish." Although the script had "its moments of pathos" and "some powerful (if repetitive) things to say about black-white relationships", Ruth Gower "hardly varied her two expressions — of hesitant humour and of proud stubbornness — and she was not able to show fully the qualities the Negro writer finds so compelling" and "the feeling of precise locality varied from scene to scene" and "one missed an abundance of fine, full close-ups—something that cannot be compensated for by any number of sets."

See also
 List of television plays broadcast on ATN-7

References

External links
 

1961 television plays
1960s Australian television plays
1961 Australian television episodes
The General Motors Hour